Thomas Lewis (19 April 1829 – 19 June 1901) was an Australian cricketer. He played three first-class matches for New South Wales between 1856/57 and 1859/60.

See also
 List of New South Wales representative cricketers

References

External links
 

1829 births
1901 deaths
Australian cricketers
New South Wales cricketers
People from Marylebone